High Moon is a horror Western webcomic series featuring werewolves. It was developed in 2004 with a debut in 2007 as a part of Zuda, DC Comics' webcomic imprint. The first season concluded on July 8, 2008. Season two ran from August 16 to November 25, 2008. Season three began its run on February 9, 2009. Season four began its run on October 3, 2009. Serialization ended when Zuda Comics shut down in 2010. Papercutz re-released High Moon in a new collection in 2017, consisting of three volumes for their Super Genius imprint.

Publication history
Created by David Gallaher and Steve Ellis, High Moon was part of Zuda's initial launch in October 2007. Month later, High Moon was awarded a contract with DC Comics, where the strip was serialized on Zuda.com. Scott O. Brown was the production artist and letterer.

Synopsis
In the first series, a bounty hunter, Matthew Macgregor, investigates a series of strange happenings in the Texas town of Blest, where drought has brought famine and hardship to most of the town and surrounding ranches. Additionally, the nights are haunted by werewolves. While Macgregor, a former Pinkerton detective, seeks to uncover the town's secrets, he tries desperately to keep secret his own past steeped in witchcraft and the supernatural. The second series finds werewolf-hunter Macgregor in Ragged Rock, Oklahoma, investigating a series of murders following a bizarre train robbery, and finds himself caught in a vendetta and confronting a technological monstrosity. In series three, Macgregor helps a young woman and finds himself amid two warring factions in the Black Hills of South Dakota.

Characters 
 Matthew Macgregor: A descendant of Scottish outlaw Robert "Rob Roy" Macgregor, the protagonist is a stubborn and grumbly retired Pinkerton. He first appears on page 3 of Season 1. As of page 17, he demonstrates a degree of ritual psychometry. He carries a pair of pistols with the words Gáe Bolga carved into the handles. As seen on page 30 of the strip, his bullets of choice are Blaine bullets. Mac's history shows a past with James Bowie, Abe Lincoln, Allan Pinkerton, and Marie Laveau.
 Eddie Conroy: An African-American outlaw afflicted with lycanthropy. After MacGregor is killed, Conroy assumes his identity. He is seen on page 5 in werewolf form, and again on page 6 in human form.
 Tristan Macgregor: Member of the Macgregor family, an esoteric subset of the Pinkertons and brother of Matthew. He has a mechanical arm, conceals his face with goggles, and uses steampunk weapons invented by Nikola Tesla.
 Red: Conroy's loyal wolfdog.

Supporting characters
 Tara Bradley: Daughter of legendary lawman Sheriff Patrick Bradley, Tara is a beautiful redhead who since moving to Blest has been working for the Sheriff's office. She first appears on page 2.
 Deputy Jeb Garret: He first appears on page 2. He enjoys reading dime novels.
 Gabriel Hunter: The founder of Blest and father of the little girl who goes missing on page 1 of the story arc, he first appears on page 2.
 Margaret Hunter: Goes missing in page 1 of the opening prologue.
 Mavis Hunter: Seen on page 7, and recounts his story in a flashback on page 10.
 Sheriff Patrick Bradley: Mentioned on page 2, he does not appear in the prologue.
 Doc McNear: Appears on page 11, where he aids Mavis Hunter with her hysteria, and later is confronted by Conroy.
 Were-Bats: Strange, multi-eyed, multi-armed bat-like creatures, spawned from the Jim Bowie caves.
 Miss Molly: Appears on page 33, she is the owner of the Crabapple dance hall.
 Deirdre – Wife of Tristan.
 Young Raven – A Red Indian mystic who becomes Conroy's lover. She is the granddaughter of Raven the Trickster, a legendary Native American character.
 Dr. Bell – An English detective based on Sherlock Holmes. He is revealed to be the alter ego of the vicious serial killer Mr. Hyde.
 Others include Ester, August, and Frederick Kittel, Vivian, and Egregore.

Print
Bayou and High Moon were the first two Zuda titles to be published as graphic novels, in June and October 2009, respectively by DC Comics.

In October 2017, Papercutz published new trade editions of the series.

Awards
 High Moon was nominated for two 2009 Harvey Awards, for Best New Series and Best Online Work, winning the latter award.
 High Moon was nominated for a 2010 Harvey Award for Best Online Work.

Notes

References
 Zudacomics.com: High Moon
 High Moon Production Blog

External links
 Comixology.com New York Comic Con podcast
 D'Orazio, Valerie. "Occasional Interviews: Zuda Artist Steve Ellis on High Moon, OccasionalSuperheroine.com, October 31, 2007
 "Last Minute Edition – David Gallaher on High Moon and Zuda.com", YourMomsBasement.com, October 30, 2007
 Kean, Benjamin Ong Pang. "The Opening Team: Talking to the First Wave of Zuda Creators", Newsarama, November 1, 2007
 DavidGallaher.com
 Hypersteve.com (Steve Ellis official site)

2007 webcomic debuts
2000s webcomics
American webcomics
Werewolf comics
Horror Westerns
Horror webcomics
Webcomics in print
Western (genre) webcomics
Zuda Comics titles